Abbie Trayler-Smith is a Welsh documentary and portrait photographer who contributed to  The Daily Telegraph for eight years from 1998, covering the war in Iraq and the Asian tsunami. In 2010, with her portrait Chelsea, she won fourth prize in the Taylor Wessing competition, and second prize in 2017 for Fleeing Mosul.

Life and career

Abbie Trayler-Smith was born in Wales. She is self-taught, specializing in documentary and portrait photography. She worked for The Daily Telegraph for eight years. She has been working as a freelance artist since 2007.

Awards
2010: Fourth prize, Taylor Wessing competition, for Chelsea
2017: Second prize, Taylor Wessing Photographic Portrait Prize, for Fleeing Mosul

Personal life

Trayler-Smith lives in London, England.

Publications
Rise: Images of Life Change. Edited by John Levy. Dubai: Legatum Foundation; Foto8, 2010. . With text by Max Houghton and photographs by Carmen Elsa Lopez, William Daniels, Robin Hammond, Trayler-Smith, Venetia Dearden, Sanjit Das, Atul Loke, and Kate Shortt.
Common Ground. Document Scotland, 2014. Includes work by each Document Scotland member as well as by members of Welsh photography collective A Fine Beginning, including Trayler-Smith. With essays by Malcolm Dickson and Anne McNeill. Published to accompany an exhibition at Street Level Photoworks, Glasgow.

References

External links

Living people
Documentary photographers
British portrait photographers
Welsh women photographers
Year of birth missing (living people)
The Daily Telegraph people
Women photojournalists